Stictomyia punctata is a species of ulidiid or picture-winged fly in the genus Stictomyia of the family Ulidiidae.

References

Ulidiinae